Joshua Elia Williams (born 3 September 1986), known by his stage name J. Williams, is a New Zealand R&B recording artist and professional hip-hop dancer. He made his musical debut in 2008 with "Blow Your Mind" which peaked at number 13 on the New Zealand Singles Chart. In early 2009 his debut album Young Love  was released with the single "You Got Me"  featuring Scribe. It was certified platinum and became the #1 selling single of 2010 in New Zealand.

Biography 
Joshua Elia Williams was born on 3 September 1986. His father is of Samoan descent and his mother of Fijian descent.  He attended Weymouth Intermediate School in Weymouth, South Auckland and attended James Cook High School in Manurewa.

He compares his upbringing to that of the Jackson 5 family, as his father was very strict regarding religion and music. Williams' has two younger sisters, Keziah and Ezra, and two older sisters, Emily and Lavinia, who have both appeared on Australian Idol.

Williams was a member of the hip hop street dance group originally called Dziah (now known as Prestige). In 2006 Dziah represented New Zealand at the World Hip Hop Dance Championships in Los Angeles. They came second to the current champions, the Philippine All Stars. In 2008 at the same competition, this time as Prestige, they came fourth.

Williams and his partner Larissa Brown separated shortly before the birth of their child Ryder, and abuse caused and fueled by alcohol. Williams stepped down from his post as Rugby World Cup ambassador. Williams has since undergone counselling, and in 2012 rekindled a relationship with his high school sweetheart, Renee Marriot.

Music career

Funding 
From 2008 to March 2011 Williams received over $100,000 dollars in funding from the taxpayer-funded New Zealand On Air. This included $50,000 to produce the album, and multiple grants to make music videos.

2008 – 2010: Young Love 

In September 2008 "Blow Your Mind" was released as the lead single from Williams' debut album. It peaked at number 13 on the New Zealand Singles Chart. Second single "Set it Off", was released to commercial radio stations in early 2009 and charted at number thirty six. In March 2009, Williams released his third single, "Ghetto Flower", which peaked at number 5 on the same chart. The song was certified Gold in New Zealand on 9 June 2009, selling over 7,500 copies. and was written by his sister, Emily Williams. The fourth single, "Stand with You", was released in June 2009, and peaked at number 6 in New Zealand, becoming his second consecutive top-10 single. It featured his sister, Lavina Williams. The song was certified Gold in New Zealand on 13 September 2009, selling over 7,500 copies.

On 13 July 2009 Williams released his debut album, Young Love. The album debuted at number five on the New Zealand Top 40 Albums Chart and was certified gold. On 9 November 2009 Williams released his fifth single from the album, "Your Style" which featured New Zealand singer, Erakah. The single peaked at number 16 on the New Zealand Singles Chart.

In February 2010, Williams released sixth single "You Got Me", featuring New Zealand rapper Scribe. The single peaked at number one on the New Zealand Singles Chart, and was certified Platinum. In December 2010, it was declared that "You Got Me" was the #1 selling single of 2010 in New Zealand.

2010 – present 
On 25 May 2010 Williams released "Takes Me Higher", which features pop singer Dane Rumble. The single only had a digital release. It peaked at number two on the New Zealand Singles Chart. In December 2010, "Takes Me Higher" was declared the #19 best seller of 2010 in New Zealand. "Night of Your Life" was released on 11 October 2010 and received a gold certification.
in 2010 J toured Germany having visited 13 cities and being part of one of their biggest TV music shows which NZ artist friend Dane Rumble joined him with.

In 2012, Williams was the supporting act for New Zealand boy band, Titanium on their Come On Home Tour.

Discography

Studio albums

Singles

As featured artist

Music videos

Awards and nominations

References

External links 
Official Bebo site
Record Label site
Profile on muzic.net.nz
Profile on amplifier.co.nz
Feature profile on Television New Zealand's Close Up programme

1986 births
Living people
New Zealand people of Samoan descent
New Zealand male singer-songwriters
New Zealand contemporary R&B singers
New Zealand pop singers
New Zealand hip hop musicians
New Zealand people of I-Taukei Fijian descent
21st-century New Zealand male singers